Kido (written: 木戸 lit. "tree door" or "wooden door", or 城戸 lit. "castle door") is a Japanese surname.

Notable people with the surname
, Japanese ice dancer
, Japanese voice actress 
, Japanese singer better known as Junko Hirotani
, minister of the Cabinet of Japan during World War II
, Japanese professional footballer
 Markis Kido (1984–2021), Indonesian badminton player
, Japanese professional wrestler
, Japanese equestrian
, Japanese politician of the Meiji Government
, Japanese kickboxer

Fictional characters
 Joe Kido, character from the Digimon animated series
 Madoka Kido, character from the School Rumble manga series
 Noriko Kido, character in the Barom-1 tokusatsu series
 Shinji Kido, main character in the Kamen Rider Ryuki tokusatsu series
 Tatsuhiko Kido, male protagonist of the manga Nozoki Ana
 Tsubomi Kido, female character from Kagerou Project
 Takeshi Kido, Chief Inspector of Kempeitai in TV series The Man in the High Castle 
 Yuuto Kido, male protagonist of the anime Inazuma Eleven

Japanese-language surnames